Acrolepia aureella is a moth of the family Acrolepiidae. It was described by Blanchard in 1852. It is found in Chile.

References

Moths described in 1852
Acrolepiidae
Endemic fauna of Chile